David Steelman is an American politician from the state of Missouri.

David Steelman earned a B.A. in economics from the University of Missouri, and graduated first in his class from the University of Missouri Law School in 1978. He is the son of the late Dorman L. Steelman, who served in the Missouri House of Representatives, as a circuit judge, and as chairman of the Missouri Republican Party.

Steelman, a Republican, was elected to his first term in the Missouri House of Representatives in 1978 at the age of 25 (under the state constitution, the minimum age for a state representative is 24).  He was re-elected in 1980 and 1982, and was chosen by his colleagues to serve as minority floor leader. Steelman did not seek re-election in 1984, returning to the practice of law in his native Rolla, Missouri. Steelman's House colleague William L. Webster was elected Attorney General in 1984 and re-elected in 1988, and Steelman eventually went to work for Webster as an Assistant Attorney General.

Webster vacated the Attorney General's office to run unsuccessfully for governor in 1992, and Steelman ran to succeed him. In the Republican primary, Steelman faced Assistant United States Attorney John Hall, a moderate Republican who previously had worked for former U.S. Senator John C. Danforth and for then-Governor Kit Bond. Danforth campaigned aggressively for Hall, while Steelman attacked Hall's relative liberalism and his Harvard pedigree.

Steelman won the Republican primary handily but lost the general election to Jay Nixon, 51% to 45%.  The general election featured Nixon and Steelman both engaging in frequent personal attacks against one another, which surely contributed to the 4% of votes received by the Libertarian candidate.

Steelman has not sought elective office since 1992, instead focusing on his law practice. His wife, Sarah Steelman served in the Missouri State Senate from 1999 to 2005, as state treasurer from 2005 to 2009, and was a candidate for Governor of Missouri in 2008, until she lost the Republican primary. In 2012 she lost a bid for the US Senate in the Republican primary against Representative Todd Akin.

Sources
Steelman biodata

1950s births
Living people
American lawyers
People from Rolla, Missouri
Republican Party members of the Missouri House of Representatives
University of Missouri alumni